Germantown is an unincorporated community in Franklin County, in the U.S. state of Pennsylvania.

History
In 1878, Germantown had approximately 50 inhabitants.

References

Unincorporated communities in Franklin County, Pennsylvania
Unincorporated communities in Pennsylvania